Brieg may refer to:

 Brzeg (German name Brieg), in Silesia, Poland
 Duchy of Brzeg, a duchy of Silesia from 1311 – 1675
 Briec (Breton name Brieg), a town in Brittany
 Saint-Brieuc (Breton name Sant-Brieg), commune in the Côtes-d'Armor Department in Brittany in north-western France
 Brig, Switzerland